Ruifang District is a suburban district in eastern New Taipei City, Taiwan.

History

Mining was an important industry in Ruifang (then known as Sui-hong) in the early 20th century. Gold was mined in Kyūfun and Kinkaseki while coal was mined in Kau-tong (猴硐; Houtong).

After the handover of Taiwan from Japan to the Republic of China in 1945, Ruifang was organized as an urban township of Taipei County. The mining sites became popular tourist destinations after 1990. On 25 December 2010, Taipei County was upgraded into a municipality named New Taipei City and Ruifang became a district of the municipality. In March 2012, it was named one of the Top 10 Small Tourist Towns by the Tourism Bureau.

Administrative divisions
There are thirty-four urban villages in the district which are divided between four election districts:
Election District One
Longtan, Longxing, Longzhen, Longan, Longshan, Longchuan, Zhaofeng, Xinfeng, Tunghe, Ganping, Houtong, Guangfu, Gongqiao, Shuoren
Election District Two
Jiqing, Jian, Shangtian, Jieyu
Election District Three
Fuzhu, Chongwen, Jishan, Songde, Yongqing, Xinshan, Tongshan, Shishan, Guashan
Election District Four
Bitou, Lianxin, Liandong, Nanya, Haibin, Ruibin, Shenao

Education
 New Taipei Municipal Jui-Fang Industrial High School

Tourist attractions

 Bitou Cape
 Bitoujiao Lighthouse
 Golden Waterfall
 Houtong Cat Village
 Houtong Coal Mine Ecological Park
 Jinguashi
 Jiufen (Shengping Theater, Taiyang Gold Mine Office)
 Jiufen Gold Mine Museum
 Jiufen Kite Museum
 New Taipei City Gold Museum
 Remains of the 13 Levels
 Shen'ao Fishing Port
 Yin Yang Sea

Transportation

Ruifang is served by the Yilan Line of Taiwan Railways. There are four stations in Ruifang Township, which are Ruifang Station, Houtong Station, Sijiaoting Station and Sandiaoling Station.

Provincial Highway 62 passes Ruifang and provides a convenient connection to Keelung City.

Notable natives
 Gau Ming-ho, mountaineer
 Wu Nien-jen, scriptwriter, director and author

See also
 New Taipei City

References

External links 

  

Districts of New Taipei